Jonathan Hall Kovacs (also known as Johnny Kovacs or Jon K, born October 20, 1969 in Alameda County, California) is an American former child actor and director. Nowadays, he is an entertainer, educator and explorer.

Biography

Acting
Jonathan Kovacs appeared as a semi-regular character during the ninth season of Little House on the Prairie and as a regular character on the 1983 series The Family Tree. He was nominated for a Young Artist Award in 1984 as the Best Young Actor in a Drama Series for The Family Tree. He also made several appearances in other popular television works of that time period, in which all of the characters he played were deaf people.

Adult life and career
In 1988, he graduated with honours from California School for the Deaf in Fremont, California. He returned there after a couple of years away from school.
He did several plays and ITV, a course in learning how to film and edit.

As an adult, he has directed a few short stage performances. His interest in ASL performances gave birth to Rathskellar (performing arts) in 1998 to showcase the raw beauty of sign language by combining it with visual arts and pulsating music. It turned out to astonish crowds and quickly became internationally known for thrilling levels of originality and intensity, which are rarely seen in ASL productions.

Personal life
Kovacs is deaf.

Filmography

External links
 
 The Rathskellar Official Homepage

Sources

1969 births
Living people
American male deaf actors
American male child actors
American male television actors
People from Alameda County, California